Haumania liebrechtsiana is a species of plant in the family Marantaceae. It grows as an understorey herb or climber in tropical forests in Central Africa. The leaves and shoots are eaten by gorillas and chimpanzees, and the leaves and stems have traditional uses.

Description
The stems are hairy and branching, and the leaves are alternate. The long petiole sheaths the stem for most of its length and has a short calloused section just beneath the leaf blade. On the upper side of the blade there is a beak where this calloused region becomes the midvein. The fruit is a round, yellowish capsule containing black seeds.

Distribution and habitat
Haumania liebrechtsiana is endemic to tropical western Central Africa. Its range includes Gabon, the Democratic Republic of the Congo and the Republic of the Congo. It is a rainforest plant, a climbing species that sometimes dominates the understorey. It occurs in moist habitats, near streams and in flooded areas.

Ecology
In the Congo Basin, this plant is often found in degraded secondary growth forest where it dominates the understorey; Zenker's fruit bat (Scotonycteris zenkeri) is often found in its vicinity. Gorillas also favour this plant, selecting the leaves and shoots but rejecting the other parts of the plant, and chimpanzees and the Dryas monkey also selectively feed on the foliage.

Uses
This plant has many uses. The leaves are used for wrapping food and other objects. Fibres from the stems are used in weaving and as cord, and in the manufacture of animal traps. The split petioles serve as skewers and the split stems as arrow cases. The ash is used in herbal medicine for external application.

References

Marantaceae
Flora of Africa
Plants described in 1899
Taxa named by Émile Auguste Joseph De Wildeman